Archie Wood (18 March 1926 – 17 June 1986) was a Scottish footballer, who played as a winger in the Football League for Tranmere Rovers.

References

External links

Tranmere Rovers F.C. players
Witton Albion F.C. players
Association football wingers
English Football League players
1926 births
1986 deaths
Scottish footballers
People from Leven, Fife